Aerenea brunnea is a species of beetle in the family Cerambycidae. It was described by Thomson in 1868. It is known from Argentina, Colombia, Brazil, Suriname, French Guiana, Panama, Peru, Bolívia, Paraguay, Venezuela, and Trinidad and Tobago.

References

Compsosomatini
Beetles described in 1868